Aggressive infantile fibromatosis is a locally recurring, non-metastasizing lesion, presenting with a single or multiple fast-growing masses that are present at birth or occur within the first year of life.

See also 
 Infantile digital fibromatosis
 Skin lesion

References

Dermal and subcutaneous growths